The 1993 Columbia Lions football team was an American football team that represented Columbia University during the 1993 NCAA Division I-AA football season. Columbia tied for last in the Ivy League. 

In their fifth season under head coach Ray Tellier, the Lions compiled a 2–8 record and were outscored 294 to 155. Adam Yeloushan was the team captain.  

The Lions' 1–6 conference record tied for seventh (and worst) in the Ivy League standings. Columbia was outscored 209 to 118 by Ivy opponents. 

Columbia played its homes games at Lawrence A. Wien Stadium in Upper Manhattan, in New York City.

Schedule

References

Columbia
Columbia Lions football seasons
Columbia Lions football